Greenwood, also known as Greenwood Heights, is a historic home located at Columbia, Missouri.  It was built about 1839, and is a two-story, "T"-plan, Federal style red brick farmhouse on a stone foundation. It is one of the oldest remaining structures in Boone County, Missouri. Today the house is under private ownership.

The property was added to the National Register of Historic Places in 1979.

References

External links

Historic American Buildings Survey in Missouri
Houses on the National Register of Historic Places in Missouri
Federal architecture in Missouri
Houses completed in 1839
Houses in Columbia, Missouri
African-American history in Columbia, Missouri
National Register of Historic Places in Boone County, Missouri